Julian Jasinski (born 27 April 1996) is a German-Polish professional basketball player for Rawlplug Sokół Łańcut of the PLK.

References

External links
 Basketball Champions League Profile
 
 Eurobasket.com Profile

1996 births
Living people
Basket Zielona Góra players
German men's basketball players
Polish men's basketball players
Power forwards (basketball)
Small forwards
Sportspeople from Bochum
Telekom Baskets Bonn players